Cramer may refer to:

Businesses 
 Cramer brothers, 18th century publishers
 Cramer Systems, a software company
 Cramer & Co., a former musical-related business in London

Other uses
 Cramer (surname), including a list of people and fictional characters
 Cramer, Minnesota, United States, an unincorporated community
 Mount Cramer, Idaho, United States

See also
 
 
 Kramer (disambiguation)